Grace Helen Mowat (January 31, 1875 – February 22, 1964) was a Canadian artist and writer living in New Brunswick.

Early life and education

The daughter of George Mowat and Isabella Campbell, Mowat was born on the Beech Hill family farm near St. Andrews, New Brunswick. The Mowat family was of United Empire Loyalist descent. In her childhood, Mowat spent a lot of time surrounded by her older relatives. There she developed an interest in narrative from reading old archived letters written by both sides of her family.

She was educated at Charlotte County Grammar School and went on to study at Richmond School of Art and Music in London and the Women's Art School at Cooper Union in New York City.

Career

Writer 
Mowat wrote lighthearted accounts of local history such as Funny Fables of Fundy (1928), and the Diverting History of a Loyalist Town (1932). In the 1920s–30s, Mowat diverted her talents towards the local theatre as a playwright. The Perfect Actor, and the Unguarded Boarder, were among exceedingly popular attractions in the summer, and garnered the attention of many visitors.

Teacher 
She started her teaching career at St. Catherine's Hall in Augusta, Maine. From there, she taught art classes at the Halifax Ladies College from 1902 to 1906. In 1907, she suffered a nervous breakdown and returned home to St. Andrews.

Art Director 
In 1914, Mowat founded Charlotte County Cottage Craft, which provided an outlet for locally produced traditional crafts including pottery and weaving, and she served as its director until 1945. With her help, New Brunswick crafts were exhibited at the 1924 British Empire Exhibition in Wembley, London, England. She also founded the St. Andrews Music, Art, and Drama Society in 1934. Mowat wrote plays such as The Perfect Actor and The Unguarded Border.

Later life

Honours 
The University of New Brunswick awarded Mowat an honorary Doctor of Laws degree in 1951.

Death 
She died in St. Andrews at the age of 89, and was buried under the headstone "Founder of Charlotte County Cottage Craft" in a rural family plot.

Selected works 
 Funny Fables of Fundy (1928)
 The Diverting History of a Loyalist Town, A Portrait of St. Andrews (1932)
 Broken Barrier: A Romance of Staten Island and the Province of New Brunswick (1951)
 The House That Hurricane Jack Built (1954)
 A Story of Cottage Craft (1958)
  The Tories' King: George III and the Seeds of the Revolution (1976)

References

External links
 

1875 births
1964 deaths
20th-century Canadian artists
20th-century Canadian dramatists and playwrights
20th-century Canadian women artists
20th-century Canadian women writers
Artists from New Brunswick
Canadian women dramatists and playwrights
Cooper Union alumni
People from Saint Andrews, New Brunswick
Writers from New Brunswick